Jan Vacek was the defending champion but did not compete that year.

Gustavo Kuerten won in the final 6–7(4–7), 7–5, 7–6(7–2) against Guillermo Coria.

Seeds

  Fernando Meligeni (second round)
  Sjeng Schalken (second round)
  Tommy Robredo (first round)
  Mariano Zabaleta (second round)
  Agustín Calleri (quarterfinals)
  Gustavo Kuerten (champion)
  Dominik Hrbatý (quarterfinals)
  André Sá (quarterfinals)

Draw

Finals

Top half

Bottom half

References
 2002 Brasil Open Draw

Men's Singles
Singles